Bảo Lâm is a rural district of Cao Bằng province in the Northeast region of Vietnam. As of 2019 the district had a population of 65 025. The district covers an area of 902 km². The district capital lies at Mông Ân.

Administrative divisions
Pác Miầu District consists of the district capital, Pác Miầu, and 12 communes: Đức Hạnh, Lý Bôn, Mông Ân, Nam Cao, Nam Quang, Quảng Lâm, Thạch Lâm, Thái Học, Thái Sơn, Vĩnh Phong, Vĩnh Quang, Yên Thổ.

References

Districts of Cao Bằng province

vi:Bảo Lâm